Major General (Retd) Janaka Walgama RSP, VSV, USP, ndu, psc was the Military Adviser to the Sri Lanka's Permanent Representation to the United Nations at New York.

Early life and education
Janaka received his education from Nalanda College Colombo. Contemporaries of Janaka at Nalanda are the present Air Chief, Air Marshal Kapila Jayampathi, Former Air Chief Air Chief Marshal Gagan Bulathsinghala, Major General Milinda Peiris, Major General Ubaya Madawela, Consultant Neurologist Udaya Ranawaka & former Sri Lanka test cricketer Sanath Kaluperuma.

Army career
During the war times he was the General Officer Commanding 22 Division in Trincomalee and Commander for 65 Division in Thunukkai (Kilinochchi).

Prior to the present appointment he held the appointments as the Military Secretary of the Army, Commandant of the Defence Services Command and Staff College, Director General Operations at the Office of the Chief of Defence Staff. He was the General Officer Commanding 51 Division in Jaffna and Director General of Defence Intelligence also at the Office of the Chief of Defence Staff earlier.

He has also been the Commandant of the Sri Lanka Military Academy at Diyatalawa thus been one rare Officer to hold both appointments as the Commandant of the Military Academy and the Staff College respectively. He has served as the Commander Security Forces-East. He was also the former Colonel Military Secretary at the Army Headquarters.

References 

 
 

 

Sri Lankan Buddhists
Sri Lankan major generals
Sinhalese military personnel
Alumni of Nalanda College, Colombo
Sri Lanka Military Academy graduates
Sri Lanka Engineers officers